The women's 10,000 metres event at the 1987 Pan American Games was held in Indianapolis, United States on 13 August. It was the first time that this event was contested at the Games.

Results

References

Athletics at the 1987 Pan American Games
1987
Pan